Rooster Heart (French: Coeur de coq) is a 1946 French comedy film directed by Maurice Cloche and starring Fernandel, Gisèle Alcee and Jean Témerson. The film's sets were designed by Robert Giordani.

Plot
A man is too shy to ask a girl out and decides to kill himself. While lying in the road he is rescued by a Doctor who tries to cure him by implanting the heart of a rooster into him, something which suddenly makes him irresistible to women.

Cast
 Fernandel as Tulipe  
 Gisèle Alcée as Loulou  
 Jean Témerson as Stanislas Pugilaskoff 
 Marcel Vallée as Tournesol 
 Maximilienne as Mme Estelle  
 Henri Arius as Lacorbiere  
 Darcelys 
 Marthe Marty 
 Lorette Gallant 
 Paul Azaïs as Serapain  
 Rouzeaud 
 Jacques Hélian 
 Michel Roger 
 Maria Aranda 
 Mireille Perrey as Mme Bourride, dite :Vera  
 Mag-Avril
 Cora Camoin 
 Henri Doublier 
 Liane Marlene
 Zappy Max as Un musicien de l'orchestre

References

Bibliography 
 Quinlan, David. Quinlan's Film Stars. Batsford, 2000.

External links 
 

1946 films
French comedy films
1946 comedy films
1940s French-language films
Films directed by Maurice Cloche
Gaumont Film Company films
French black-and-white films
1940s French films